Bathouism (also, Bathou) is the folk religion of the Boro people of Assam in Northeast India. The chief deity, called  (: "the Elder")—omnipresent, omniscient and omnipotent—is said to have created the five principles. Though there are other minor gods and goddesses, Bathoubwrai is considered the Supreme God. Bathoubwrai is unseen.

It is reported that Bathouism will be included in the Indian census.

plant
The  plant, a woody species of (Euphorbia) is considered the living embodiment of Bathoubwrai.  Families that follow Bathouism plant a  shrub at the northeast corner of their courtyard, in an altar called .  Bodo communities that follow Bathouism generally plant a  shrub at a community land, fenced with eighteen pairs of bamboo strips with five fastenings. Each pair symbolizes a pair of minor god-goddess. The five fastenings signify, from bottom: birth, pain, death, marriage and peace/pleasure. The bottom three fastenings, called , are those that one cannot escape in life; whereas the top two one could.

Gods, goddesses and gurus
Sidney Endle differentiates between household gods and community gods.  Of the household gods Bathoubwrai, Mainao, Song Bwrai/Burai and Bura Bagh Raja are considered prominent. The practice of representing Bathoubwrai by the  tree was more common among Boros (or Mech) of Goalpara region, and less so in Darrang. Song Raja is usually represented inside the house in an altar called , a deity who obtains devotion from women, and receives offerings during women's menses; but these offerings are eventually brought out and laid at the  tree representing Bathou.

The eighteen pairs of gods-goddesses are: 

 Mwnsinsin bwrai-Mwnsinsin burwi
 Si Bwrai-Si Burwi
 Aham Bwrai-Aham Burwi
 Khuria Bwrai-Khuria Burwi
 Eheo Bwrai-Eheo Burwi
 Mainao Bwrai-Mainao-Burwi
 Bwlli Bwrai-Bwlli Burwi
 Deva Bwrai-Devi Burwi
 Gongar Bwrai-Gongar Burwi
 Joumwn Bwrai-Joumwn Burwi
 Song Raja-Song Rani
 Hasung Bwrai-Hasung Burwi
 Rajong Bwrai-Rajong burwi
 Agrang Bwrai-Agrang Burwi
 Hazw Bwrai-Hazw Burwi
 Emao Bwrai-Emao Burwi
 Mohela Bwrai-Mohela Burwi
 Hafao Bwrai-Hafao Burwi

Worship

Traditional
Traditional Bathouism did not have any written scriptures or religious books, nor temples. Notable religious festivals were Kherai, Garja and others. These ceremonies are performed by priests called Douri (male priest) and Doudini (female priest). This religion was not organized.

Revivalism/Reformation
All Bathou Religious Union, an organization, was constituted in 1992 and it has begun reviving and reforming the traditional religion. Sacrifices of animals and fowls, and offering of rice beer as modes of worship has been replaced by offering of flowers, fruits and the burning of incense. The partaking of  has also become popular.

See also 
 Ahom religion
 Donyi Polo
 Sanamahism

Notes

References

 
 
  

Bodo
Asian ethnic religion
Religion in Assam
Indian religions